Telephone Operator is a 1937 American film directed by Scott Pembroke and starring Judith Allen, Grant Withers, Warren Hymer, and Alice White.

Premise 
A telephone operator covering for an absent friend is flooded with calls seeking emergency assistance as the Riverdale Dam bursts and the community falls victim to a major deluge.

Cast 
Judith Allen as Helen Molly
Grant Withers as Red
Warren Hymer as Shorty
Alice White as Dottie Stengal
Ronnie Cosby as Ted Molloy
Pat Flaherty as Tom Sommers
Greta Granstedt as Sylvia Sommers
William Haade as Heaver
Cornelius Keefe as Pat Campbell
Dorothy Vaughan as Mrs. Molloy

External links 

1937 films
1937 drama films
1930s disaster films
American black-and-white films
American disaster films
American drama films
Films directed by Scott Pembroke
Monogram Pictures films
Films about telephony
1930s English-language films
1930s American films